Traceability is the capability to trace something. In some cases, it is interpreted as the ability to verify the history, location, or application of an item by means of documented recorded identification.

Other common definitions include the capability (and implementation) of keeping track of a given set or type of information to a given degree, or the ability to chronologically interrelate uniquely identifiable entities in a way that is verifiable.

Traceability is applicable to measurement, supply chain, software development, healthcare and security.

Measurement
The term measurement traceability is used to refer to an unbroken chain of comparisons relating an instrument's measurements to a known standard. Calibration to a traceable standard can be used to determine an instrument's bias, precision, and accuracy. It may also be used to show a chain of custody - from current interpretation of evidence to the actual evidence in a legal context, or history of handling of any information.

In many countries, national standards for weights and measures are maintained by a National Metrological Institute (NMI) which provides the highest level of standards for the calibration / measurement traceability infrastructure in that country. Examples of government agencies include the National Physical Laboratory, UK (NPL) the National Institute of Standards and Technology (NIST) in the USA, the Physikalisch-Technische Bundesanstalt (PTB) in Germany, and the Instituto Nazionale di Ricerca Metrologica (INRiM) in Italy. As defined by NIST, "Traceability of measurement requires the establishment of an unbroken chain of comparisons to stated references each with a stated uncertainty."

A clock providing  is traceable to a time standard such as Coordinated Universal Time or International Atomic Time. The Global Positioning System is a source of traceable time.

Supply chain
Within a product's supply chain, traceability may be both a regulatory and an ethical or environmental issue. Traceability is increasingly becoming a core criterion for sustainability efforts related to supply chains wherein knowing the producer, workers and other links stands as a necessary factor that underlies credible claims of social, economic, or environmental impacts. Environmentally friendly retailers may choose to make information regarding their supply chain freely available to customers, illustrating the fact that the products they sell are manufactured in factories with safe working conditions, by workers that earn a fair wage, using methods that do not damage the environment.

Materials
In regard to materials, traceability refers to the capability to associate a finished part with destructive test results performed on material from the same ingot with the same heat treatment, or to associate a finished part with results of a test performed on a sample from the same melt identified by the unique lot number of the material. Destructive tests typically include chemical composition and mechanical strength tests. A heat number is usually marked on the part or raw material which identifies the ingot it came from, and a lot number may identify the group of parts that experienced the same heat treatment (i.e., were in the same oven at the same time). Material traceability is important to the aerospace, nuclear, and process industry because they frequently make use of high strength materials that look identical to commercial low strength versions. In these industries, a part made of the wrong material is called "counterfeit", even if the substitution was accidental.

This same practice extends throughout industries using military hardware, including the fastener industry.

Logistics

In logistics, traceability refers to the capability for tracing goods along the distribution chain on a batch number or series number basis. Traceability is an important aspect for example in the automotive industry, where it makes recalls possible, or in the food industry where it contributes to food safety.

The international standards organization EPCglobal under GS1 has ratified the EPCglobal Network standards (especially the EPC Information Services EPCIS standard) which codify the syntax and semantics for supply chain events and the secure method for selectively sharing supply chain events with trading partners. These standards for traceability have been used in successful deployments in many industries and there are now a wide range of products that are certified as being compatible with these standards.

Food processing
In food processing (meat processing, fresh produce processing), the term traceability refers to the recording through means of barcodes or RFID tags & other tracking media, all movement of product and steps within the production process. One of the key reasons this is such a critical point is in instances where an issue of contamination arises, and a recall is required. Where traceability has been closely adhered to, it is possible to identify, by precise date/time & exact location which goods must be recalled, and which are safe, potentially saving millions of dollars in the recall process. Traceability within the food processing industry is also utilised to identify key high production & quality areas of a business, versus those of low return, and where points in the production process may be improved.

In food processing software, traceability systems imply the use of a unique piece of data (e.g., order date/time or a serialized sequence number, generally through the use of a barcode / RFID) which can be traced through the entire production flow, linking all sections of the business, including suppliers & future sales through the supply chain. Messages and files at any point in the system can then be audited for correctness and completeness, using the traceability software to find the particular transaction and/or product within the supply chain.

In food systems, ISO 22005, as part of the ISO 22000 family of standards, has been developed to define the principles for food traceability and specifies the basic requirements for the design and implementation of a feed and food traceability system. It can be applied by an organization operating at any step in the feed and food chain.

The European Union's General Food Law came into force in 2002, making traceability compulsory for food and feed operators and requiring those businesses to implement traceability systems. The EU introduced its Trade Control and Expert System, or TRACES, in April 2004. The system provides a central database to track movement of animals within the EU and from third countries.

Australia has its National Livestock Identification System to keep track of livestock from birth to slaughterhouse.

India has started taking initiatives for setting up traceability systems at Government and Corporate levels. Grapenet, an initiative by Agriculture and Processed Food Products Export Development Authority (APEDA), Ministry of Commerce, Government of India is an example in this direction. GrapeNet is an internet based traceability software system for monitoring fresh grapes exported from India to the European Union. GrapeNet is a first of its kind initiative in India that has put in place an end-to-end system for monitoring pesticide residue, achieve product standardization and facilitate tracing back from pallets to the farm of the Indian grower, through the various stages of sampling, testing, certification and packing. Grapenet won the National Award (Gold), in the winners announced for the best e-Governance initiatives undertaken in India in 2007. 

The Directorate Generate Foreign Trade (DGFT), Government of India, through its notification 
 dated 04.02.2009 relating to Amendment in Foreign Trade Policy (RE2008)has mandated that Export to the European Union is permitted subject to registration with APEDA, thereby making Grapenet mandatory for all exports of fresh grapes from India to Europe.

Uruguay has also designed a system called Traceability & Electronic Information System of the Beef Industry.

Forest products
Within the context of supporting legal and sustainable forest supply chains, traceability has emerged in the last decade as a new tool to verify claims and assure buyers about the source of their materials. Mostly led out of Europe, and targeting countries where illegal logging has been a key problem (FLEGT countries), timber tracking is now part of daily business for many enterprises and jurisdictions. Full traceability offers advantages for multiple partners along the supply chain beyond certification systems, including:

 Mechanism to comply with local and international policies and regulations.
 Reducing the risk of illegal or non-compliant material entering the supply chains.
 Providing coordination between authorities and relevant bodies.
 Allowing automatic reconciliation of batches and volumes available.
 Offering a method of stock control and monitoring.
 Triggering real-time alerts of non-compliance.
 Reducing likelihood of recording errors.
 Improving effectiveness and efficiency.
 Increasing transparency.
 Promoting company integrity.

A number of timber tracking companies are in operation to service global demand.

Enhanced traceability ensures that the supply chain data is 100% accurate from the forest to the point of export. Nowadays, there are techniques to predict geographical provenance of wood and contribute to the fight against illegal logging.

Systems and software development
In systems and software development, the term traceability (or requirements traceability) refers to the ability to link product requirements back to stakeholders' rationales and forward to corresponding design artifacts, code, and test cases. Traceability supports numerous software engineering activities such as change impact analysis, compliance verification or traceback of code, regression test selection, and requirements validation. It is usually accomplished in the form of a matrix created for the verification and validation of the project. Unfortunately, the practice of constructing and maintaining a requirements trace matrix (RTM) can be very arduous and over time the traces tend to erode into an inaccurate state unless date/time stamped. Alternate automated approaches for generating traces using information retrieval methods have been developed.

In transaction processing software, traceability implies use of a unique piece of data (e.g., order date/time or a serialized sequence number) which can be traced through the entire software flow of all relevant application programs. Messages and files at any point in the system can then be audited for correctness and completeness, using the traceability key to find the particular transaction. This is also sometimes referred to as the transaction footprint.

Health care 
Patient safety during healthcare service plays an important role in preventing delayed recovery or even mortality, by increasing and improving the quality of life of citizens, and is considered an indicator of the quality status of health services Maintaining patient safety is a complex task and involves factors inherent to the environment and human actions.  New technologies facilitate the traceability tools of patients and medications. This is particularly relevant for drugs that are considered high risk and cost.

The World Health Organization has recognized the importance of traceability for medical products of human origin (MPHO) and urged member states "to encourage the implementation of globally consistent coding systems to facilitate national and international traceability".

Security and crime-fighting

To prevent theft, and assist in locating stolen objects, goods may be marked indelibly or undetectably so that they may be determined to be stolen, and in some cases identified. For example, it is sometimes arranged that stolen banknotes are marked with indelible dye to show that they are stolen; they can be identified by their unique serial numbers. Announcing that cash machines were fitted with sprayers of SmartWater, an invisible gel detectable for years, to mark thieves and their clothing when breaking into or tampering with the machine was found in a 2016 pilot scheme to reduce theft by 90%.

See also
 Provenance

References

Firma List en Bedrog est. 2006

External links

National Institute of Standards and Technology
NIST Policy on Traceability
"Traceability" from the Global Legal Information Network Subject Term Index 
 Video which explains the relationship between Calibration - Traceability - Accreditation with flow measuring devices
 Hospital Traceability Solutions|Lūg Healthcare Technology technology tools in the Health sector to control and improve the efficiency of their critical processes.

Barcodes
Radio-frequency identification
Wireless locating
Software engineering
Systems engineering
Forest certification
Pharmaceuticals policy

de:Rückführbarkeit